Maria Conway (born 19 May 1984 in Oxford, England), is a former British Women's International motorcycle trials rider. Conway was British Women's Trials Champion in 2002 and a member of the winning British Women's TDN team in 2006 and 2007.

Biography
Conway competed in the inaugural Women's World Trials Championship in 2000 placing 9th in the series.

In 2001 Conway again competed in the World Championships, narrowly missing out on the podium finishing in 4th place, the top placed British rider in the event.

2002 was to be Conway's year, taking the first ever British Women's Trials Championship ahead of Donna Fox and placing 5th in the World Championships that year held in Portugal.

The best finish in the World Championships for Conway was to come the following year in 2003 when she ended the season in 3rd place behind Laia Sanz and Iris Kramer at the event in San Marino. In the European Women's Championship the finish was to be identical with a podium of Sanz, Kramer and Conway. During the season she also ventured over to the US to compete in the final two rounds of the NATC Trials Championship winning both events ahead of US Champion Christy Williams. To top off a busy season Conway was a member of the British Women's TDN team which finished runner-up to the German team in Italy.

Conway returned to Italy with the TDN team in 2005 and again finished runner-up to a strong German team. Add to this a 4th place in the European Championships and a 5th in the World Championships; it can be chalked up as another successful season for Conway.

The highlight of 2006 was being a member of the British Women's TDN Team that took the win ahead of the Spanish team. The other members of the team that took victory in France were Donna Fox and Rebekah Cook.

With the British TDN team now being heralded as one of the favourites they once again took the win in 2007, this time on home soil as the event was held on the Isle of Man. Runners up were the German team. She also finished 5th in the World Championship after placing 6th in the Czech round and 5th in the British round.

2008 again produced a 5th place in the World Championship. Conway was again a member of the TDN team which finished 3rd behind the Spanish and German teams
.

International Trials Championship Career

Honors
 British Women's Trials Champion 2002
 Women's TDN Winning Team Member 2006, 2007

Related reading
FIM Trial European Championship
FIM Trial World Championship

References 

1984 births
Living people
British motorcycle racers
Motorcycle trials riders